Arbuckle is an unincorporated community in Erie County, Pennsylvania, United States.

Notes

Unincorporated communities in Erie County, Pennsylvania
Unincorporated communities in Pennsylvania